Caer is the fourth studio album by Dominican-American singer-songwriter George Lewis Jr., under his stage name Twin Shadow. It was released on April 27, 2018 under Warner Music Group.

Release
On February 22, 2018, Twin Shadow announced the release of the new album, alongside two new singles "Little Woman" and "Saturdays", which features a collaboration by Haim. On March 16, 2018, the next single "Brace" was released, with a collaboration by Rainsford.

Critical reception
Caer was met with "generally favorable" reviews from critics. At Metacritic, which assigns a weighted average rating out of 100 to reviews from mainstream publications, this release received an average score of 69, based on 10 reviews. Aggregator Album of the Year gave the release a 69 out of 100 based on a critical consensus of 10 reviews.

Track listing

Personnel

Musicians
 George Lewis Jr – lead vocals, producer
 Rainey Qualley – vocals
 Alana Haim – vocals
 Danielle Haim – vocals
 Este Haim – vocals

Production
 Wynne Bennett – producer
 Nate Donmoyer – engineer
 BJ Burton – mixer

References

External links
 
 

2018 albums
Twin Shadow albums
Warner Music Group albums